James Ernest Charles Ram (born January 18, 1971) is a Canadian former professional ice hockey goaltender.

Biography
Ram was born in Scarborough, Ontario. As a youth, he played in the 1984 Quebec International Pee-Wee Hockey Tournament, with a minor ice hockey team from Mississauga.

He was drafted in the tenth round, 213th overall, by the New York Rangers in the 1991 NHL Entry Draft. He played one National Hockey League game with the Rangers, in the 1995–96 season, replacing Glenn Healy and playing the last 29 minutes of a game against the Colorado Avalanche. He stopped all nine shots he faced.

Ram is married to Tania Ram, and has two sons and two daughters.

Awards and honors

See also
 List of players who played only one game in the NHL

References

External links
 

1971 births
Living people
Amur Khabarovsk players
Binghamton Rangers players
Brynäs IF players
Canadian expatriate ice hockey players in Finland
Canadian expatriate ice hockey players in Russia
Canadian expatriate ice hockey players in Sweden
Canadian expatriate ice hockey players in the United States
Canadian ice hockey goaltenders
Cincinnati Mighty Ducks players
Jokerit players
Kentucky Thoroughblades players
Michigan Tech Huskies men's ice hockey players
New York Rangers draft picks
New York Rangers players
Sportspeople from Scarborough, Toronto
Ice hockey people from Toronto
Severstal Cherepovets players
Utah Grizzlies (IHL) players
AHCA Division I men's ice hockey All-Americans